The San Marino national U-19 football team is the national under-19 football team of San Marino and is controlled by the San Marino Football Federation.

The team's head coach is Roberto Marcucci.

They compete in UEFA European Under-19 Football Championship qualifying rounds every year. They have played 33 official games with 32 defeats and only one draw.

On August 30, 2022. San Marino U19 achieved its first victory in a 4–0 win against Gibraltar.

Current squad
 The following players were called up for the 2023 UEFA European Under-19 Championship qualification matches.
 Match dates: 17, 20 and 23 November 2022
 Caps and goals correct as of:''' 30 August 2022, after the match against

Recent results and fixtures

References 

European national under-19 association football teams
Under 19